The acts of the 113th United States Congress includes all Acts of Congress and ratified treaties by the 113th United States Congress, which lasted from January 3, 2013 to January 3, 2015.

Acts include public and private laws, which are enacted after being passed by Congress and signed by the President. If, however, the President vetoes a bill, it can still be enacted by a two-thirds vote in both houses. The Senate alone considers treaties, which must be ratified by a two-thirds vote.

Summary of actions
In this Congress, all of the statutes were promulgated (signed) by President Barack Obama. None were enacted by Congress over the President's veto.

Public laws

Private laws

No private laws were enacted this Congress.

Treaties

See also
 Proposed bills of the 113th United States Congress
 List of United States federal legislation
List of Acts of the 112th United States Congress
List of Acts of the 114th United States Congress

External links

 Authenticated Public and Private Laws from the Federal Digital System
 Legislation & Records Home: Treaties from the Senate
 Private Laws for the 113th Congress at Congress.gov
 Public Laws for the 113th Congress at Congress.gov
 

113